The canton of Évian-les-Bains is an administrative division of the Haute-Savoie department, southeastern France. Its borders were modified at the French canton reorganisation which came into effect in March 2015. Its seat is in Évian-les-Bains.

It consists of the following communes:

Abondance
La Baume
Bernex
Le Biot
Bonnevaux
Champanges
La Chapelle-d'Abondance
Châtel
Chevenoz
La Côte-d'Arbroz
Essert-Romand
Évian-les-Bains
Féternes
La Forclaz
Les Gets
Larringes
Lugrin
Marin
Maxilly-sur-Léman
Meillerie
Montriond
Morzine
Neuvecelle
Novel
Publier
Saint-Gingolph
Saint-Jean-d'Aulps
Saint-Paul-en-Chablais
Seytroux
Thollon-les-Mémises
Vacheresse
La Vernaz
Vinzier

References

Cantons of Haute-Savoie